Mohammad Amin (born 10 October 1920, date of death unknown) was a Pakistani cricketer who played first-class cricket from 1944 to 1957, and played for Pakistan in the years before Pakistan played Test cricket.

Cricket career
A leg-spin and googly bowler, Mohammad Amin played for Northern India in the Ranji Trophy before Pakistan gained independence. In December 1947 he played in the first first-class match in Pakistan, representing Punjab against Sind. He took 3 for 52 and 6 for 113 to help Punjab to an innings victory. He was thus the first player to take six wickets in an innings in Pakistan. He took 15 wickets in that first short season of cricket in Pakistan; no one else took more than nine. In a 12-a-side three-day match between Punjab and Sind in 1948–49 he took 12 wickets.

Amin played in Pakistan's first match, which was against the touring West Indians in 1948–49, taking three wickets. He toured Ceylon with the Pakistan team later that season and played in both matches against Ceylon, but bowled only 18 overs, taking two wickets. His final match for Pakistan was against the Commonwealth XI in 1949–50.

When the Quaid-e-Azam Trophy began in 1953–54, Amin played for Pakistan Railways. He took 13 wickets at an average of 18.15 in the two matches, including 5 for 57 and 4 for 89 when Railways lost to Punjab in the semi-final, but younger spinners were preferred for the Test tour of England in 1954. He was one of three reserve players named for the tour, but he was not required. His last season was 1957–58, when in three matches for Railways he took 11 wickets at an average of 17.72. 

Amin is deceased.

References

External links
 Mohammad Amin at CricketArchive
 Mohammad Amin at Cricinfo

1920 births
Year of death missing
Pakistani cricketers
Cricketers from Lahore
Northern India cricketers
Pakistan Railways cricketers
Punjab (Pakistan) cricketers